Roderick McGregor VC (1822 – 9 August 1888) was a Scottish recipient of the Victoria Cross, the highest and most prestigious award for gallantry in the face of the enemy that can be awarded to British and Commonwealth forces.

Details
McGregor was about 31 years old, and a private in the 1st Battalion, The Rifle Brigade (Prince Consort's Own), British Army during the Crimean War when the following deed took place for which he was awarded the VC.

In July 1855 at the Quarries, Crimea, a bandsman going to fetch water from a well in front of the advanced trench, was killed. A number of men at once rushed out determined to drive the Russian riflemen from the pits which they occupied. Private McGregor and two others were the first to reach the Russians, whom they drove out, killing some. Private McGregor was employed as a sharpshooter in the advance trenches before Sebastopol. He crossed an open space under fire and, taking cover under a rock, dislodged two Russians who were occupying a rifle-pit.

The official citation was as follows:

Further information
Grave and memorial located at St. Mary's Churchyard, Drumnadrochit (also known as Old Kilmore Churchyard) near Urquhart, Highland Region, Scotland. Headstone.

The medal
His Victoria Cross is displayed at the Royal Green Jackets (Rifles) Museum in Winchester, England.

References

Monuments to Courage (David Harvey, 1999)
The Register of the Victoria Cross (This England, 1997)
Scotland's Forgotten Valour (Graham Ross, 1995)

External links
Location of grave and VC medal (Highland, Scotland)

Crimean War recipients of the Victoria Cross
British recipients of the Victoria Cross
British Army personnel of the Crimean War
Rifle Brigade soldiers
1824 births
1888 deaths
People from Highland (council area)
British military personnel of the Indian Rebellion of 1857
British Army recipients of the Victoria Cross